Nova Social is an electronic pop duo from New York and New Jersey. They have released two EPs and two full-length albums, and also recorded the theme song to Cartoon Network's Calling Cat-22. Band member David Nagler has arranged and produced tracks for Chicago singer/songwriter Chris Mills, provided choral arrangements for The Mekons' Jon Langford and the Burlington Welsh Male Chorus, and plays guitar and piano in John Wesley Harding & The English UK. Band member Thom Soriano has recorded electronic compositions and remixed tracks for artists (including They Might Be Giants and Dan Bryk) as The Kendal Mintcake.

Band members
David Nagler - vocals, instruments, programming
Thom Soriano - instruments, programming, sampling

Discography
Nova Social (EP) (Big Sleep Records, 2009)
Other Words From Tomorrow's Dictionary (Big Sleep Records, 2007)
High School Reunion (compilation) (American Laundromat Records, 2005)
There Is No Hidden Meaning (compilation) (Kabukikore Records, 2004) 
The Jefferson Fracture (Big Sleep Records, 2002)
Don't Settle for Walking (EP as Stretch) (Big Sleep Records, 1998)

External links
Official Website
[ All Music Guide Entry]
Last.fm Entry

Indie rock musical groups from New York (state)
Musical groups from New York City
Musical groups from New Jersey